Glen Park station is an underground Bay Area Rapid Transit (BART) station located in the Glen Park neighborhood of San Francisco, California. The station is adjacent to San Jose Avenue and Interstate 280.

San Jose/Glen Park station on the Muni Metro J Church line is located nearby in the median of San Jose Avenue.

Design 

The station was designed by the firm of Corlett & Spackman and architect Ernest Born in the brutalist style. Born also designed the graphics for the entire BART system. Service began on November 5, 1973. The November 1974 Architectural Record wrote of the station:

Born designed a marble mural at the west end of the mezzanine. "100 pieces, few of which are cut at right angles, in warm brown and red-brown tones, make it up". The mural is prominently featured in a scene of the 2006 Will Smith film The Pursuit of Happyness.

The station was nominated in 2019 to be listed on the National Register of Historic Places. The Glen Park Association submitted the application, funded by a grant from San Francisco Heritage, whose president called the station "the best example of Brutalism in San Francisco, if not the entire Bay Area."

See also 
 List of Bay Area Rapid Transit stations

References

External links 

BART – Glen Park

Bay Area Rapid Transit stations in San Francisco
Stations on the Yellow Line (BART)
Stations on the Green Line (BART)
Stations on the Red Line (BART)
Stations on the Blue Line (BART)
Railway stations in the United States opened in 1973
National Register of Historic Places in San Francisco